Ariella Käslin (anglicised Kaeslin; born 11 October 1987) is a Swiss former artistic gymnast. She won all five gold medals at the 2007 Swiss National Championships, and has represented Switzerland at the World Championships in 2007, 2006 and 2005, and was a medalist on the World Cup circuit. Käslin represented Switzerland at the 2008 Olympics, where she placed 18th in the individual all-around final and 5th in the vault event final.

In 2008, 2009 and 2010, Käslin was voted by the Swiss public as "Swiss Sportswoman of the Year"; only cyclist Tony Rominger (1992, 1993, 1994) had previously achieved three consecutive "Sportsman of the Year" awards in Switzerland.

In 2009, she became European Champion on the vault, as well as taking home a bronze medal in the All Around final. She then followed up this success with a silver medal on the vault at the 2009 World Championships.

On 11 July 2011 Käslin announced her retirement from competition.

In April 2021, Käslin came out as a lesbian. Regarding her decision to come out publicly, she remarked: "I then understood that as a public figure, I also had to come out publicly, otherwise I would never be able to live my love for a woman in complete freedom. But I'm also scared."

References

External links

Ariella Käslin homepage
"Gespräch mit Ariella Käslin" 2013 interview (in German)

1987 births
Living people
Swiss female artistic gymnasts
Gymnasts at the 2008 Summer Olympics
Olympic gymnasts of Switzerland
European champions in gymnastics
LGBT gymnasts
Swiss lesbians
Lesbian sportswomen
Swiss LGBT sportspeople
Medalists at the World Artistic Gymnastics Championships
21st-century Swiss LGBT people
Sportspeople from Lucerne
21st-century Swiss women